In Conflict is the fourth full-length album by Canadian indie rock artist Owen Pallett, released May 27, 2014 on Domino Records and Secret City Records. The album features English ambient musician Brian Eno, who plays guitar and synthesizers as well as providing vocals. It was released on standard vinyl and CD as well as a limited edition double heavyweight LP. It was recorded by Mark Lawson. Canadian and Japanese special editions include exclusive bonus tracks.

Critical reception

At Rolling Stone, Ned Raggett stated that "In Conflict is a pop treasure that's also a stirring, personal work of art." Sasha Geffen of Consequence of Sound wrote that "In Conflict is ominous, gloomy, and marked with some of the most playful arrangements Pallett’s laid to date." James Christopher Monger of AllMusic rated the album four-and-a-half stars, writing that the music contains a mixture of the "sugary opulence" reminiscent of Kishi Bashi and Jónsi and the "chilly refinement" akin to Björk circa 1997's Homogenic time period.

The album was a shortlisted nominee for the 2014 Polaris Music Prize.

Track listing

Domino Double LP bonus track
 "Bridle & Bit"

Personnel
Owen Pallett – vocals, violin, viola, piano, ARP 2600, Nord G2X, Roland Juno-60, MiniMoog
Matt Smith – bass, vocals
Robbie Gordon – drums
Brian Eno – synthesizers, guitar, vocals
Thomas Gill – guitar
Stef Schneider – percussion
Daniela Gesundheit – vocals
Czech FILMharmonic Orchestra

References

2014 albums
Owen Pallett albums
Domino Recording Company albums